Mark Sanchez (born January 17, 1987) is a former American-Mexican professional basketball player.

Professional career
Aris Leeuwarden signed Sanchez for the 2010–11 season, and later he re-signed to also play the 2011–12 season for Aris.

Sanchez signed with the Austrian team ece Bulls Kapfenberg in 2012. He was brought back after his first season. In his second season, he was named the Austrian Basketball Cup MVP. With Kapfenberg he lost in the Finals of the Austrian league to Güssing, but Sanchez did get the league's MVP award.

For the 2014–15 season he first signed with ALM Évreux Basket, but after he got cut by the team he signed with the Dutch club Donar on 5 November 2014.

On social media, Sanchez announced his retirement in June 2015.

References

External links
RealGM.com profile and statistics
Eurobasket.com profile

1987 births
Living people
ALM Évreux Basket players
American expatriate basketball people in Austria
American expatriate basketball people in Israel
American expatriate basketball people in France
American expatriate basketball people in the Netherlands
American men's basketball players
Aris Leeuwarden players
Donar (basketball club) players
Basketball players from Tucson, Arizona
Boise State Broncos men's basketball players
Dutch Basketball League players
Hapoel Holon players
Junior college men's basketball players in the United States
Kapfenberg Bulls players
Power forwards (basketball)
Small forwards